Nine Mile is a district in Saint Ann Parish, Jamaica, a few miles south of Brown's Town. The population was about 300 in 2009. On February 6, 1945, the reggae musician Bob Marley was born there. He was later buried there. Marley‘s house is located in the village, as well as his mausoleum, where his body lies along with his mother, Cedella Booker.

Bob Marley Mausoleum

The Bob Marley Mausoleum is a tourist attraction located in Nine Mile, managed by members of Marley's family. It has many historical artifacts including guitars, awards and photographs. Nine Mile is where Bob Marley's musical career began and also influenced many of his songs.

There is a Rasta-colored ‘rock pillow’ on which Marley laid his head when seeking inspiration.  His body lies buried along with his guitar in a  oblong marble mausoleum inside a small church of traditional Ethiopia design. 
There are two mausoleums on the property. The first is that of Marley's mother, Cedella Booker, known as Mama Marley. The second contains the remains of Marley himself.

References

External links
Caribbean - Jamaica - Bob Marley Museum, by Judith Baker - Travelwriters UK.
Bob Marley birth village - Nine Mile (Jamaica).

Populated places in Saint Ann Parish
Tourist attractions in Saint Ann Parish
Museums in Jamaica
Monuments and memorials in Jamaica
Buildings and structures in Saint Ann Parish
Bob Marley